The Finland women's national basketball team represents Finland in international women's basketball competitions. They are governed by Basketball Finland.

Finland has appeared in five editions of the EuroBasket between 1952 and 1987, with 6 wins in 34 matches. It hasn't qualified for a major tournament since.

2021 Roster 
Roster for the EuroBasket Women 2021 qualification.

2011 Roster
 Guards
 [1.83] Krista Gross
 [1.70] Anette Juvonen
 [1.73] Vilma Kesänen
 [1.75] Linda Lehtoranta
 [1.72] Reetta Piipari
 Forwards
 [1.82] Evita Iiskola
 [1.83] Henna Koponen
 [1.85] Heta Korpivaara 
 [1.74] Dionne Pounds
 [1.77] Henna Salomaa
 [1.87] Minna Sten
 [1.89] Tiina Sten
 [1.90] Taru Tuukkanen
 [1.80] Hanna Vapamaa

See also
 Finland women's national under-19 basketball team
 Finland women's national under-17 basketball team
 Finland women's national 3x3 team

References

External links
Official website
Finland National Team - Women at Eurobasket.com

 
Women's national basketball teams